Morgans Landing is an unincorporated community in Putnam County, West Virginia, United States. The community is located at the mouth of Bills Creek on the Kanawha River along U.S. Route 35.

The town is home to American Electric Power's John E. Amos Power Plant.

References

Unincorporated communities in Putnam County, West Virginia
Unincorporated communities in West Virginia
Charleston, West Virginia metropolitan area